Erwin Kremers (born 24 March 1949) is a German former professional footballer who played as a striker. His twin brother, Helmut Kremers, also played as a German international with the two brothers playing with each other regularly. Erwin and Helmut Kremers are the first ever twins to play in the Bundesliga.

Career
Kremers began his football career as a youth player, along with his brother, at Borussia Mönchengladbach before eventually going on to make over 20 appearances for the first team in the Bundesliga. After two years at the club he (and his brother) moved on to Kickers Offenbach where he had an impressive strike record with 10 goals in just 25 starts. In the summer on 1971 he and his brother both moved to FC Schalke 04 and it was in the following year that he got his call up to the German national team. Kremers went on to play 15 times for his country, playing in the winning 1972 UEFA European Football Championship team and he scored a total of three goals.

References

External links
 
 
 

1949 births
Living people
Sportspeople from Mönchengladbach
German footballers
Germany international footballers
Bundesliga players
Association football forwards
Borussia Mönchengladbach players
Kickers Offenbach players
FC Schalke 04 players
UEFA Euro 1972 players
UEFA European Championship-winning players
German twins
Twin sportspeople
Footballers from North Rhine-Westphalia
Recipients of the Medal of the Order of Merit of the Federal Republic of Germany
West German footballers